Marek Niedziałkowski (born 9 September 1952) is a Polish rower. He competed in the men's coxless four event at the 1980 Summer Olympics.

References

1952 births
Living people
Polish male rowers
Olympic rowers of Poland
Rowers at the 1980 Summer Olympics
Sportspeople from Gdańsk